Mullah Rahmatullah Najib is the current Deputy Director of Intelligence of the Islamic Emirate of Afghanistan since 7 September 2021, alongside Taj Mir Jawad.

Career 
Prior to his promotion to the cabinet, Najib served as a field commander.

In June 2016, Najib was reported to be the Taliban's shadow governor for Logar Province and to have been subjected to false claims of killing by Afghan forces.

On 7 September 2021, Najib was made Deputy Director of Intelligence of the Islamic Emirate of Afghanistan, alongside Taj Mir Jawad, under Director of Intelligence Abdul Haq Wasiq.

References 

Living people
Taliban government ministers of Afghanistan
Year of birth missing (living people)